Heba Aly (born 1982) is an Egyptian handball coach of the Australian national team, which she coached at the 2019 World Women's Handball Championship.

References

1982 births
Living people
Handball coaches of international teams
Date of birth missing (living people)
21st-century Egyptian people